Ximerose (Greek: Ξημέρωσε) is a studio album by Greek artist Glykeria. It was released in 1991 by the WEA Greece and is composed by Christos Nikolopoulos and Lefteris Papadopoulos.

Track listing 
 "Tha Pethano Apo Erota" (I will die from love) – 3:55
 "Gennieme Mia" (Born once) – 4:13
 "Einai I Agapi Mou Trelli" (My love is crazy) – 3:19
 "Se Latrevo" (I love you very much) – 3:46
 "Dio Kai Dio" (Two and two) – 2:33
 "Ximerose" (It has dawned) – 3:25
 "Fevgo Fevgo" (I'm leaving, I'm leaving) – 2:36
 "Ola" (Everything) – 3:31
 "Kathotane Se Ekeino To Trapezi" (He was sitting on that table) – 3:50
 "Ase Na Pethano" (Let me die) – 3:27
 "Pikres" (Bitterness) – 3:30
 "Ekpliktika Matia" (Amazing eyes) – 3:14
 "Oli Mou I Zoi" (All my life) – 4:06

References

1991 albums
Glykeria albums
Greek-language albums